Suczki  is a village in the administrative district of Gmina Gołdap, within Gołdap County, Warmian-Masurian Voivodeship, in north-eastern Poland, close to the border with the Kaliningrad Oblast of Russia. It is located in the historic region of Masuria.

The village was founded by Poles.

References

Villages in Gołdap County